Tatyana Neroznak (born 18 February 1992) is a Kazakhstani runner. In 2020, she competed in the women's half marathon at the 2020 World Athletics Half Marathon Championships held in Gdynia, Poland.

In 2013, she competed in the women's 1500 metres event at the 2013 Asian Athletics Championships held in Pune, India.

In 2018, she competed in the women's 1500 metres event at the 2018 Asian Games held in Indonesia. She finished in 10th place.

References

External links 
 

Living people
1992 births
Place of birth missing (living people)
Kazakhstani female middle-distance runners
Kazakhstani female long-distance runners
Athletes (track and field) at the 2018 Asian Games
Asian Games competitors for Kazakhstan
Asian Indoor Athletics Championships winners
21st-century Kazakhstani women